Varman Dynasty or Khmer Dynasty (Khmer: រាជវង្សវរ្ម័ន; The Rhea vong sa Varaman , Roman: Varman Dynasty of Khmer) The Varman Dynasty or the Khmer Dynasty is a royal family in the Khmer Empire (Khmer: ព្រះរាជាណាចក្រកម្ពុជា). The Varman Dynasty was established by King Kaundinyavarmandeva (Khmer: កៅណ្ឌិន្យវរ្ម័នទេវ), who married Queen Soma (Khmer: សោមា), who ruled the indigenous kingdom and established her spouse as the king of the Nokor Phnom or Funan kingdom, forming the Varman dynasty.

Family Tree

References

Cambodian monarchs
Khmer Empire
Cambodian